

Brownlow is a locality in the Australian state of South Australia about  north-east of the Adelaide city centre

Its boundaries were created for the “long established name” for the western part in August 2000 which is located within the Regional Council of Goyder and for the eastern part in March 2003 which is located within the Mid Murray Council. The name comes from the older cadastral land division in which Brownlow lies, the Hundred of Brownlow, which was named for Charles Henry Brownlow.

The principal land use within the locality is agriculture involving "extensive grazing."

Brownlow is located within the federal divisions of Barker and Grey, the state electoral district of Stuart and the local government areas of the Mid Murray Council and Regional Council of Goyder.

Hundred of Brownlow

The Hundred of Brownlow is the cadastral unit of hundred containing the Brownlow locality. It is one of the 16 hundreds of the County of Eyre. It was named in 1883 by Governor William Jervois after Charles Henry Brownlow (1831–1916), a senior (British) Indian Army officer at the time.

The locality of Brownlow occupies the majority of the land area of the Hundred of Brownlow, but parts of Bower and Mount Mary occupy smaller portions in the north of the hundred and part of Steinfeld overlaps the southern boundary.

See also
Brownlow (disambiguation)
Lands administrative divisions of South Australia

References

Towns in South Australia